Aspermont High School is a public high school located in Aspermont, Texas (CSA) and classified as a 1A school by the UIL.  It is part of the Aspermont Independent School District located in central Stonewall County.   In 2015, the school was rated "Met Standard" by the Texas Education Agency.

Athletics
The Aspermont Hornets compete in these sports - 

Volleyball, Cross Country, 6-Man Football, Basketball, Golf, Tennis & Track

State titles
Boys Basketball 
1968(1A)

State finals appearances
Football - 
1999(1A)

References

External links
Aspermont ISD
List of Six-man football stadiums in Texas

Public high schools in Texas
Public middle schools in Texas